The presidency of Dina Boluarte began with her inauguration as the president of Peru on 7 December 2022, immediately following the removal of Pedro Castillo from office in the aftermath of his attempted self-coup.

This cabinet takes its name from the President of the Republic Dina Boluarte, who appoints Pedro Angulo as President of the Council of Ministers.

Background 
The formation of this government comes three days after the investiture of Dina Boluarte as President of the Republic and after the attempted self-coup of Pedro Castillo that occurred the same morning. From her speech as the new president, she declares "to ask for a political truce to install a government of national unity".

History

First negotiations 
As of 8 December, President Dina Boluarte announces that she will meet with all the parliamentary groups, being herself a president without a label, and therefore without any party or group supporting her continuously in Congress to form a political government.

Nevertheless, it meets most of the parliamentary groups of the center and the right, in particular Popular Force, Go on Country, Popular Renewal, Popular Action, Integrity and Development and the left group of Together for Peru.

According to deputies from Free Peru, President Dina Boluarte offered her former party a place in the government, which the parliamentarians refused. A few hours later, party leader Vladimir Cerrón confirmed that the party refuses to join the government and refuses the convocation of the group by the president, it is the only group that refused the invitation, demonstrating the still continuous support for Pedro Castillo and destroyed relations with Boluarte.

All the parliamentary groups, and especially the center and the right, announce that they will not join the government,  all preferring a technical government of national unity, and especially on the left, demanding the calling of shap general election.

Pro-Castillo protests 
Nevertheless, the parliamentary groups agree on the need to quickly appoint a unity government, in an attempt to calm the protests in the street. Because from the appointment of Dina Boluarte, about a thousand people marched in Lima towards the Congress.

Other demonstrators also blocked the Panamericana highway the same day with rocks, logs and burning tires to demand general elections and the closure of Congress, as Pedro Castillo wanted.

In Ica, several dozen demonstrators paralyzed the transport of passengers and freight vehicles. In Arequipa, a thousand kilometers south of Lima, there were also blockages on the Panamericana Sur highway.

Street mobilizations were also reported in other parts of the interior of Peru such as Chota (Cajamarca, birthplace of Castillo), Trujillo, Puno, Ayacucho, Huancavelica and Moquegua.

The first rumors about the chairman of the Council 
If the government will therefore not be political, Dina Boluarte must therefore find independent politicians, withdrawn from political life and above all experienced. The first media rumors refer to the appointment of Jorge Nieto as President of the Council of Ministers, an experienced minister from the time of the presidency of Pedro Pablo Kuczynski.

While the Minister is experienced, he is nevertheless not independent, but with a brand new centrally located party called the Party of Good Government (PBG) which does not yet have representation in Congress, which could only slightly annoy the groups in parliament.

The other two rumors mentioned would be the appointment of Alberto Otárola, former Minister of Defense during the era of the presidency of Ollanta Humala, or the current mediator of Peru Walter Gutiérrez.

Announcement and composition 
On 9 December, President Dina Boluarte announces that the composition of her government will be finalized in the evening, and announced on Saturday morning, 10 December, before noon.

Finally, the government investiture ceremony takes place at 1 p.m., and the president decides to appoint the lawyer Pedro Angulo. In the government, eight women are appointed, which is more than in all of Pedro Castillo's five governments, and the ministers belong or have belonged to a political party, but who have no parliamentary representation. The cabinet is therefore a technical government.

In addition, President Dina Boluarte has not yet decided on the Ministers of Labor and Transport, the portfolios that were most criticized and used for corruption in Castillo's governments.

Changes 
On 13 December, three days after the formation of the government, President Dina Boluarte announces the appointment of the Ministers of Labor and Transport, Eduardo García and Paola Lazarte.

On 16 December, the sixth day of government, the two Ministers of Education and Culture Patricia Correa and Jair Pérez announced their resignation, in opposition to the outbreak of the state of emergency in the country and the numerous deaths during the demonstrations in favor of Pedro Castillo, whose death toll worsened the same day, with 18 dead, confirmed by the Minister of Health Rosa Gutiérrez.

Composition

References 

Boluarte
2022 in politics
2022 in Peru
Government of Peru
December 2022 events in Peru
Current governments